Menglik Siyit (born September 1962) is a Chinese politician of Uyghur ethnicity who is the current vice chairman of Xinjiang Uyghur Autonomous Region.

Biography
Menglik Siyit was born in Shanshan County, Xinjiang, in September 1962. In 1981, he was admitted to Xinjiang Institute of Technology (now Xinjiang University), majoring in inorganic chemical. After graduation, he worked at the university.

He joined the Chinese Communist Party in November 1984, and got involved in politics in September 1998, when he was appointed vice mayor of Hami, and ten years later was promoted to the mayor position. He was deputy party secretary of Kizilsu Kyrgyz Autonomous Prefecture and secretary of its Prefectural Political and Legal Affairs Commission in September 2012, and held that office until March 2013. In May 2016, he was transferred to Turpan, where he was named acting mayor in June of that same year and installed as mayor in February 2017. In January 2018, he was elevated to vice chairman of Xinjiang Uyghur Autonomous Region.

References

1962 births
Living people
People from Shanshan County
Uyghur politicians
Xinjiang University alumni
Central Party School of the Chinese Communist Party alumni
People's Republic of China politicians from Xinjiang
Chinese Communist Party politicians from Xinjiang
Mayors of Turpan